Elizabeth Whitcraft is an American actress who played small parts in some notable American films in the 1980s and 1990s. She was often credited as Liza Whitcraft or Liz Whitcraft.

Born in 1961, and raised in New Jersey, she also lived for a time in Philadelphia and New York City, then moved to Los Angeles in the early 1980s.

Career
Her break came in 1984, where she had a supporting role in the film Birdy. She then worked in several films that starred Robert De Niro, Angel Heart (1987), and Goodfellas (1990) (the girlfriend of Joe Pesci's character). In 1988, she played a slightly more notable role as the naked woman caught with Alec Baldwin's character in Working Girl.

Whitcraft also did a few TV guest spots on the series Spenser For Hire (1985) and Quantum Leap (1989).

After co-starring in the drama Object of Obsession in 1995, Whitcraft left the acting profession. However, she did make a brief acting appearance as a fashion stylist in George Clooney's HBO TV series Unscripted (2005).

, Whitcraft was working as a fashion stylist in Los Angeles for print, film and TV.

Filmography
Birdy (1984) - Rosanne
Angel Heart (1987) - Connie
Spenser: For Hire (1988, TV Series) - Annie
Working Girl (1988) - Doreen DiMucci
Jake and the Fatman – (1990, TV Series) - Sandy (as Liza Whitcraft)
Goodfellas (1990) - Tommy's Girlfriend at Copa
Quantum Leap (1991, TV Series) - Sandy
Where Sleeping Dogs Lie (1992) - Serena's Secretary (as Liza Whitcraft)
Inside Out II (1992) - Sarah - segment "Some Guys Have All The Luck" (as Liza Whitcraft)
Eden (1993, TV Series) - Val
Object of Obsession (1994) - Christy (as Liza Whitcraft)
Unscripted (2005, TV Series) - (as Liza Whitcraft)

External links
 

American film actresses
Living people
Actresses from New Jersey
1961 births
American television actresses
20th-century American actresses
21st-century American women